WAMO (660 kHz) is a commercial AM radio station licensed to Wilkinsburg, Pennsylvania, and serving the Pittsburgh metropolitan area.  It broadcasts an Urban Contemporary radio format.  It is owned by Martz Communications Group and is operated by Audacy, Inc., under a local marketing agreement (LMA).

By day, WAMO is powered at 1,400 watts. To protect the nighttime signal of Class A WFAN in New York City on the same frequency, WAMO is a daytimer, required to go off the air at night.  Its studios and AM transmitter are located in Braddock east of Pittsburgh.  Programming is also heard on 250-watt FM translator W297BU (107.3 MHz) in Pittsburgh.  It uses the FM dial position in its moniker WAMO 107.3.

History

Early years
It broadcast on 1470 kHz, and was licensed to Portage, Pennsylvania, halfway between Johnstown and Altoona. The original call sign was WWML. It operated as a daytime-only station.  

It saw numerous format and call sign changes, (usually between country and oldies).  In 1990, 1470 finally received permission from the Federal Communications Commission to operate at night with a limited power of 88 watts. Though successful financially in its earlier years, the station and its FM sister, then known as WZGO, experienced a sharp decline in the mid 80's, as did the local economy, in part due to the collapse of the region's steel-producing and coal-mining industries.

Move to Pittsburgh area

Under FCC rules which permit a station owner to move a daytime-only station and change its frequency, the station was relocated to the Pittsburgh area with a new frequency and city of around 2004. On 660, the station first signed on with the call letters WCIX. On 1470, it had previously been known as WWML, WRML, WHYM, WZGO, and WFJY (its final calls before the move).

The station had operated Langer's National Radio Network programming lineup, but that network ceased operations in March 2010 and its format thereafter was unknown. Martz planned to put an urban/urban AC format on the station, returning this programming to the Pittsburgh market for the first time since WAMO (860 AM) and WAMO-FM (106.7) were sold to Catholic broadcasters in 2009. On May 21, 2011, WPYT and translator W261AX (100.1 FM) signed on with the promised mainstream urban format, but they have always had a shift towards rhythmic contemporary. At the end of 2011, they changed their slogan to "Pittsburgh's home for Hip-hop and Hottest Hits" and became an official rhythmic contemporary]] station.  On June 3, 2011, the station changed its call sign to WAMO, marking the return of the callsign and format after two years.  This is WAMO's fourth incarnation in Pittsburgh, as it originally broadcast on 860 AM, later with a simulcast on 105.9 FM before being moved to 106.7 in 1996.

In January 2013, WAMO was added to BDS' Rhythmic Airplay panel as an indicator reporter, but is not considered a monitored reporter because it is not rated in Nielsen Audio (as Martz is a non-subscriber) and in part due to being an AM daytimer with an FM translator, this despite having a primary emphasis on R&B/Hip-Hop material. That would change by 2017 when it became a monitored R&B/Hip-Hop reporter in both BDS and Mediabase. BDS would return WAMO back to the Rhythmic panel as a monitored reporter in February 2019 due to a adjustment in its musical direction.

Urban adult contemporary

On June 25, 2019, at 11 a.m., WAMO changed formats from rhythmic contemporary (which continued on WBZZ-HD3 and W261AX) to urban adult contemporary, branded as "107.3 The Beat"; the branding referred to WAMO's new FM translator, W297BU (107.3). On October 16, 2020, WAMO announced that the "WAMO 100" hip hop programming would move to 107.3 on November 2, marking the fourth FM frequency to carry the "WAMO" brand and the return of the hip hop format to the 660 frequency; W261AX was concurrently repurposed as an FM translator for KDKA (1020 AM). On March 22, 2022, it was announced that Audacy would purchase the WAMO intellectual property, and begin operating the station on April 4 via a local marketing agreement.

On November 18, 2022, Martz announced that it would donate the WAMO license to Pittsburgh Public Media, owner of WZUM and WZUM-FM. Following the donation's completion, the urban contemporary format will only be heard on W297BU and on the HD2 channel of Audacy-owned WDSY-FM; the move followed the expiration of a four-year window requiring W297BU to operate as a WAMO translator.

Translators

References

External links

AMO (AM)
Urban contemporary radio stations in the United States
AMO
Radio stations established in 1960
1960 establishments in Pennsylvania
Audacy, Inc. radio stations